Sutrisno Bin Darimin (born 1975) is an Indonesian powerlifter. He won three gold medals at the World Championships. In 2005, he broke the world record. The record that Sutrisno made was a total lift of 742.5 kg.

References

1975 births
Living people
Place of birth missing (living people)
Indonesian powerlifters
World Games silver medalists
Competitors at the 1997 World Games
20th-century Indonesian people
21st-century Indonesian people